Sary-Ozek is a village in the Moiynkum District of the Jambyl Region of Kazakhstan.

References

Populated places in Kazakhstan